TRAPPIST-1b, also designated as 2MASS J23062928-0502285 b, is a mainly rocky, Venus-like exoplanet orbiting around the ultra-cool dwarf star TRAPPIST-1, located approximately  away from Earth in the constellation of Aquarius. The planet was detected using the transit method, where a planet dims the host star's light as it passes in front of it. It was first announced on May 2, 2016, and between 2017 and 2018, more studies were able to refine its physical parameters.

The planet is about the same mass as Earth but about 12% larger. Its relatively low density, along with spectroscopic observations, has confirmed an extremely thick and hot atmosphere. Observations published in 2018 showed that the atmosphere of TRAPPIST-1b was much larger than that of Earth or Venus, as well as being very hot and potentially rich in CO2. More recent modeling studies have suggested the planet is too hot to allow the formation of sulfuric acid clouds, such as are found on Venus, the hottest planet in the Solar System.

Physical characteristics

Mass, radius, and temperature

TRAPPIST-1b is very similar in both mass, radius, and gravity to Earth. It has a radius of 1.121 , a mass of 1.02 , and about 81% Earth's surface gravity. However, the density of the planet indicates that it is not entirely rocky. With a density of 3.98 g/cm3, about ≤5% of its mass must be volatiles, likely in the form of a thick Venus-like atmosphere due to it receiving nearly four times more energy than Earth does. This is much hotter than the surface of Venus and may be hot enough that the surface is molten lava. In addition, the planet should be very geologically active due to tidal squeezing similar to Jupiter's moon Io, which happens to have a similar orbital period and eccentricity (see TRAPPIST-1#Resonance for references).

Orbit

TRAPPIST-1b orbits very close to its parent star. One orbit requires only 36 hours, or about 1.51 Earth days. The close proximity to its host star means that TRAPPIST-1b is likely tidally locked. It also has a very circular orbit, with an eccentricity of 0.00622, significantly more circular than Earth's orbit.

Host star

TRAPPIST-1b orbits the ultracool dwarf star TRAPPIST-1. TRAPPIST-1 is also very dim, with a luminosity about 0.0005 times that of the Sun. It is too faint to be seen with the naked eye, having an apparent magnitude of 18.80.

Atmosphere
The combined transmission spectra of TRAPPIST-1 b and c rule out cloud-free hydrogen-dominated atmospheres for both planets, so they are unlikely to harbor extended gas envelopes. Also, no helium emission from TRAPPIST-1b has been detected. Other atmospheres, from a cloud-free water-vapor atmosphere to a Venus-like atmosphere, remain consistent with the featureless spectra.

In 2018, the planet's atmosphere was better examined by the Spitzer Space Telescope and found to be quite large and hot. The planet's transmission spectrum and refined density estimate suggest two main possibilities for the atmosphere: one rich in carbon dioxide, and one rich in water vapor. A water vapor atmosphere would need to have a scale height of > and a temperature > to produce the variations seen in the planet's transit depths and its transmission spectrum, and would be vulnerable to photodissociation where CO2 would not be. Other sources for the effects seen, such as hazes and thick clouds, would require an even larger atmosphere. TRAPPIST-1b will have to be studied further to confirm its potential large atmosphere.

Gallery

See also
 55 Cancri e, another very hot planet with a confirmed atmosphere.

References

Exoplanets discovered in 2016
Near-Earth-sized exoplanets
Transiting exoplanets
TRAPPIST-1
Aquarius (constellation)